Elsa Dax (born 14 May 1972) is a French painter and a member of the Stuckists art movement. Major themes in her work are myth, legend and fairytale.

Life and career

Elsa Dax was born in Paris, and educated at the Sorbonne where she gained an MA in cinema, Russian art studies, Constructivism and Suprematism. In 1994, she worked as a production assistant for the film Beyond the Clouds, directed by Michelangelo Antonioni. In 1995 she was a librarian in the Pompidou Centre. In 1996 she was a television production assistant at the Musée d'Orsay for the film Whistler, an American in Paris, directed by Edwige Kertes.

In 1997, she was a production cinema assistant at the Ciné Lumière, French Institute, South Kensington, London, and the following year a television encoder and editor for Xtreme Information Ltd. From 1997 to 1998, she rented a 3 sq metre room in a convent, containing just a bed, a small cupboard and a tap. She spent her time there painting, "and I was very happy". In 1999, she worked as an editor at the Cannes Advertisement Festival.

In 2000, she joined the Stuckists, the anti-conceptual art  movement co-founded by Billy Childish and Charles Thomson. She first exhibited with them in their The Real Turner Prize Show at the Pure Gallery, Shoreditch, London, in that year, and participated in their first demonstration outside Tate Britain against the Turner Prize. She also took part in other demonstrations in subsequent years, and has participated in may international Stuckist shows.

In 2001 she founded the Paris Stuckists and organised the Stuckist Vernissage (Stuckist Paintings) the first Paris show of the Stuckists at the Musee d'Adzak: this included the artist Stella Vine (later made famous by Charles Saatchi), who at that time was a member of the Stuckist group. In 2004, she was one of the fourteen "founder and featured" artists in The Stuckists Punk Victorian held at the Walker Art Gallery for the Liverpool Biennial. She promoted the second Paris Stuckist show in 2005.

In 2005, she illustrated a children's book. In 2006, the Tarot Museum in Bologna acquired a Tarot deck, which she had designed in 1999.

Dax was one of the ten "leading Stuckists" in the Go West exhibition at Spectrum London gallery in October 2006.

In 2008, she was the first signatory a petition to the prime minister asking him not to approve Sir Nicholas Serota as Tate director.

She spends her time divided between Camden in London and Paris. She is now a full-time artist. As well as painting her own work, she is also a collector of other Stuckist paintings by Ella Guru, Charles Thomson, Bill Lewis, Philip Absolon, Rémy Noë and Ruth Stein.

She is married to John Kerr, an architect.

Art

Dax said that she chose her themes of myths, legends and fairytales as "I find reality terribly sad and cruel. I need to escape to another dimension," and that her style has been likened to Chagall's. A large body of her paintings are of Greek mythology, composing a mass of figurative detail. She respects the force of nature.

Research for a painting is a combination of academic books on the subject and infant picture books, which leads to a few weeks' mental preparation for the main elements. The first part of the painting is the central character, around which other images evolve in an imaginative process to "discover images like you might discover figures in a cloud."  It takes her three months to complete the painting.

She has said of her work:

Solo shows

2002, Westminster Gym, Houses of Parliament, London
2002, Lourdes Museum, Pau, France

Gallery

Notes and references

External links
Gallery of Elsa Dax myth paintings
Old gallery of Elsa Dax myth paintings
Elsa Dax in mungbeing.com
John Kerr Associates

1972 births
Living people
20th-century French painters
21st-century French painters
Stuckism
University of Paris alumni